Jalayer (also Romanized as Jalāyer) is a village in Nahr-e Mian Rural District, Zalian District, Shazand County, Markazi Province, Iran. At the 2006 census, its population was 1,359, in 302 families.

References 

Populated places in Shazand County